Bette Midler Sings the Peggy Lee Songbook is a studio album by American singer Bette Midler. Produced by Barry Manilow, it serves as a follow-up to their Grammy Award-nominated Bette Midler Sings the Rosemary Clooney Songbook (2003).  Released in 2005, the Peggy Lee tribute was Midler's first album produced in the DualDisc format, although the DVD features were limited to a few short video clips; the initial release was affected by Extended Copy Protection technology.

Promotion
The album spawned the single "Fever," a cover version of the 1956 Little Willie John record which was covered by Peggy Lee and whose 1958 rendition became the most widely known version of "Fever" and the singer's signature song. A remix of the song, produced by L.E.X, reached number 4 on the US Billboard Dance Club Songs chart in 2006.

Critical reception

AllMusic editor John Bush rated the album three and a half stars out of five and called it "a talented, affectionate record that may not add much to the cause but is a solid tribute [...] Midler's studied boredom in the verses is good enough, but when she reaches the uninhibited chorus, she reveals a marvel of catlike glee. The arrangements, most of them by Manilow, are very good, although they reveal a close knowledge of the originals that contributes to the reverence on display." John Anson, writing for The Lancashire Telegraph found that "it's all too easy to forget that as well as a comedian and actress, Miss M is a great blues and big band singer.  This collection of songs originally sung by Peggy Lee gives her a chance to remind us of her vocal talents."

Chart performance
Bette Midler Sings the Peggy Lee Songbook debuted and peaked at number ten on the US Billboard 200, selling 55,000 copies in its first week of release. This marked Midler's highest-charting album on the chart since Some People's Lives went to number six in 1991. By October 2006, it had sold 263,000 in the United States.

Track listing
All tracks produced by Barry Manilow, co-produced by David Benson.

Charts

References

2005 albums
Bette Midler albums
Columbia Records albums
Tribute albums